is a Japanese actor and voice actor. He was born in Kawagoe, Saitama and studied at the Theater Art College in Tokyo after graduating high school. He is best known to anime fans as the voice of Mewtwo. Ichimura is also the ex-husband of actress and singer Ryoko Shinohara.

Career
In 1973, he made his debut as an actor with Jesus Christ Superstar and became one of top actors of Shiki Theatre Company since then. He appeared in various musical plays as West Side Story, Equus, Cats, Evita and The Phantom of the Opera. Besides he played the role of Shylock of The Merchant of Venice.

In 1990, he left the company and now signs up for Horipro. In 2013, he played the role of Tokugawa Ieyasu in "Anjin: The Shogun and The English Samurai" in London.

In 2014, he cancelled the performance in Miss Saigon because of initial stomach cancer but in November of the year, he finished the treatment and returned to the theatre industry.

Personal life
He married Japanese actress Mami Yaezawa in 1984, but later divorced in 2003. In December 2005, he remarried singer and actress Ryoko Shinohara. They have two sons, born in 2008 and 2012.

On July 24, 2021, Masachika and Ryoko announced their divorce through their office. He took custody of two sons.

Filmography

Films
The Hotel Venus (2004) - Venus
Thirteen Assassins (2010) - Kitō Hanbei
A Ghost of a Chance (2011) - Tsukutsuku Abe
The Floating Castle (2012) - Toyotomi Hideyoshi
For Love's Sake (2012) - Shōgo Saotome
Thermae Romae (2012) - Hadrian
Thermae Romae 2 (2014) - Hadrian
The Kodai Family (2016) - Shigemasa Kōdai Jr.
The Stand-In Thief (2017)
Baragaki: Unbroken Samurai (2021) - Honda Kakuan
And So the Baton Is Passed (2021)
Daughter of Lupin the Movie (2021)

Television dramas
Shishi no Jidai (1980) - Okonogi Kyōhei
Furuhata Ninzaburō (1999) - Nao Kuroikawa
HR (2002) - Masachika Jin'no
Mayonaka no Andersen (2002)
Suna no Utsuwa (2004) - Yuzuru Asō
Order Made (2004)
My Boss My Hero (2006) - Kichi Sakaki 
Bambino! (2007) - Tekkan Shishido
Hatachi no Koibito (2007) - Fūta Suzuki 
Gō (2011) - Akechi Mitsuhide
Young Black Jack (2011) - Dr. Jotaro Honma
Beppinsan (2016) - Shigeo Asada
Ieyasu, Edo wo Tateru (2019) - Tokugawa Ieyasu
Everyone's Demoted (2019) - Hideki Fujita
Doctor-X: Surgeon Michiko Daimon (2019) - Nicholas Tange
Nakamura Nakazo: Shusse no Kizahashi (2021) - Ichikawa Danjūrō IV

Musicals
Jesus Christ Superstar - King Herod
West Side Story - Bernardo
Equus - Alan
A Chorus Line - Paul
Carousel - Jigger Craigin
She Loves Me - Georg Nowack
Cats - Rum Tum Tugger
The Phantom of the Opera - Erik, The Phantom of the Opera
Tanz der Vampire - Professor Abronsius
Miss Saigon - The Engineer
Candide - Dr. Pangloss/the narrator Voltaire
 Two Gentlemen of Verona - Thurio
Fiddler on the Roof - Tevye
You're a Good Man, Charlie Brown - Snoopy
Evita - Che
Never on Sunday - Ilya
 Kiss of the Spider Woman - Molina 
Cyrano: The Musical - Cyrano de Bergerac
 Scrooge - Scrooge
Dirty Rotten Scoundrels - Freddy Benson
Sweeney Todd - Sweeney Todd
La Cage aux Folles - Albin/Zaza
Love Never Dies - Erik, the Phantom of the Opera
Oliver - Fagin
Mozart! - Leopold

Plays
The Merchant of Venice - Shylock
Anjin: The Shogun and The English Samurai - Tokugawa Ieyasu
Yukio Ninagawa's Macbeth - Macbeth

Theatrical animation
Jack and the Beanstalk (1974) - Jack
A Journey Through Fairyland (1985) - Michael
Pokémon: The First Movie (1998) - Mewtwo
Giovanni's Island (2014) - Tatsuo Senō
Doraemon: Nobita's Space Heroes (2015) - Ikaros
Mewtwo Strikes Back: Evolution (2019) - Mewtwo
Birthday Wonderland (2019) - Hippocrates

Television animation
Pokémon: Mewtwo Returns (2000) - Mewtwo
Pocket Monsters (2020) - Mewtwo

Original video animation (OVA)
Final Fantasy VII: Advent Children (2005) - Red XIII

Video games
Super Smash Bros. Melee (2001) - Mewtwo
Kingdom Hearts (2002) - Jack Skellington
Kingdom Hearts: Chain of Memories (2004) - Jack Skellington
Kingdom Hearts II (2005) - Jack Skellington
Professor Layton and the Miracle Mask (2011) - Bronev Reinel
One Piece: Unlimited World Red (2013) - Patrick Redfield
Professor Layton and the Azran Legacy (2013) - Bronev Reinel
Nioh (2017) - Tokugawa Ieyasu

Dubbing
The Nightmare Before Christmas (1993) - Jack Skellington
Strings (2004) - Kahro
The Man Who Invented Christmas (2018) - Ebenezer Scrooge
Minions: The Rise of Gru (2022) - Wild Knuckles

Puppetry
Sherlock Holmes (2014) - Jonathan Small

Honors
Medal with Purple Ribbon (2007)
Order of the Rising Sun, 4th Class, Gold Rays with Rosette (2019)

References

External links

 
 
 Masachika Ichimura at GamePlaza-Haruka Voice Acting Database 
 Masachika Ichimura at Hitoshi Doi's Seiyuu Database 

1949 births
Japanese male stage actors
Japanese male voice actors
Living people
Japanese male musical theatre actors
Japanese male film actors
Japanese male television actors
Recipients of the Medal with Purple Ribbon
Recipients of the Order of the Rising Sun, 4th class
People from Kawagoe, Saitama
Actors from Saitama Prefecture